Pablo Ordejón (born 15 October 1930) is a Spanish fencer. He competed in the individual and team sabre events at the 1960 Summer Olympics.

References

External links
 

1930 births
Living people
Spanish male sabre fencers
Olympic fencers of Spain
Fencers at the 1960 Summer Olympics